Jiřina Jirásková (17 February 1931 – 7 January 2013) was a Czech actress. She was born and died in Prague, Czech Republic.

Biography
She studied at the Prague Conservatory and later at DAMU. After graduating, she spent one year in a regional theatre in Hradec Králové. In 1951, aged 20, she moved to the Prague's Vinohrady Theatre, where she spent her entire career. From 30 May 1990 to 30 June 2000, she was also the director of the theatre.

Jirásková began to appear in TV in the 1950s; she played in the first Czechoslovak TV series Rodina Bláhova (Bláha Family). She got her first on-screen opportunity in the spy drama Smyk, directed Zbyněk Brynych. She appeared in Every Penny Counts and Look Into His Eyes, and also worked with comedic director Zdeněk Podskalský.

In the 1970s, during the period of Czechoslovak "normalization", she was forced to leave acting. According to her own words, the ban was caused by her attitude during the reform period of the 1960s. She returned in 1983 for Karel Kachyňa's film Nurses. She appeared in more than 140 roles over 40 years.

She was the Goodwill Ambassador and President (2002-2011) of the UNICEF Czech Committee and, in 1999, tried unsuccessfully to run for the Senate representing the Civic Democratic Party.

Personal life
She was married for two years to the actor Jiří Pleskot, and spent 27 years with Zdeněk Podskalský. She had no children.

Awards
1969 - Pilsen Film Festival Audience Award for Most Popular Actress
1998 - Thalia Award
2006 - Medal of Merit

Death
Jiřina Jirásková died on 7 January 2013, aged 81.

Notable theatre appearances

Source:
Caesar and Cleopatra (Cleopatra)
The Government Inspector (Anna Andreyevna Skvoznik Dmuchanovská's governess)
Richard III (Queen Margaret)
The Diary of Anne Frank (Anne Frank)
Much Ado About Nothing (Hero)
Twelfth Night (Olivia)
Ivanov (Anna Petrovna)
Nora (Kristina Linde)
The Full Monty (Jeanette)
The Cherry Orchard (Charlotte)
Henry IV (Marchioness Matilda Spina)

Selected filmography

1960s
 1961 - Every Penny Counts (Každá koruna dobrá) as Music teacher
 1961 - Skid (Smyky) as Luisa
 1961 - Pohled do očí as Olga Valentová
 1964 - The Chintamani Carpet and a Swindler as Translator
 1964 - Courage for Every Day as Olina
 1964 - Einstein kontra Babinský as Typist Dáša 
 1964 - Kdy brečí muži as Mother
 1965 - Tales About Children as Mother
 1965 - Ninety Degrees in the Shade as Věra
 1966 - Searching as Helena Hrabáková 
 1967 - Hotel for Strangers as Marie
 1967 - Grandpa, Kylian and I as Mother
 1967 - The House of Lost Souls as Dr. Dvořáková
 1968 - Sňatky z rozumu as Hana
 1968 - Jak se zbavit Helenky as Viki
 1969 - Flirt se slečnou Stříbrnou as Mrs. Blumenfeldová 
 1969 - Světáci as Marcela
 1969 - Já, truchlivý bůh as Mrs. Stenclová

1970s
 1970 - Case for a Rookie Hangman as Tadeásová 
 1970 - Devilish Honeymoon as Alzbeta
 1970 - On the Comet as Ester

1980s
 1980 - Julek as Sword eater's wife
 1980 - Dnes v jednom domě as Dr. Frýbová (8 episodes)
 1980 - Útěky domů as Actress
 1981 - The Hit as Script
 1982 - Jak svět prichází o básníky as School director
 1983 - Bota jménem Melichar as Moutelíková
 1984 - Barrandovské nocturno aneb Jak film zpíval a tančil as Singer
 1984 - Křtiny as Secretary Karolína 
 1984 - Katapult as Anna
 1984 - Slunce, seno, jahody as Hubičková
 1984 - Vinobraní as Albína Brousková
 1984 - Jára Cimrman Lying, Sleeping as Mother
 1985 - Egy kicsit én, egy kicsit te as Eva Anyja
 1985 - Sestřičky as Granny
 1986 - Klobouk, měšec a láska as Enenke
 1987 - Stačí stisknout as Chairwoman Macková
 1987 - Arabesky as Sefrnova
 1988 - Kdyz v ráji pršelo as Dočkajka
 1988 - Muj hříšný muž as Jeníkova
 1989 - Twins at the Zoo as Josefina
 1989 - Slunce, seno a pár facek as Director Hubičková
 1989 - Příběh '88 as Zdena

1990s
 1990 - Motýlí čas as School director
 1990 - Muka obraznosti as Artlova
 1991 - Slunce, seno, erotika as Headmaster Hubičková
 1993 - Jedna kočka za druhou as Landlady
 1994 - Zámek v Čechách as Countess

2000s
 2005 - Dobrá čtvrt as Mrs. Svobodová
 2005 - Angel of the Lord as Abbess Magdalena
 2006 - Rafťáci as Dany's granny

References

External links

 UNICEF's tribute to Jirásková (in Czech)

1931 births
2013 deaths
Czech film actresses
Czech television actresses
Actresses from Prague
UNICEF people
Civic Democratic Party (Czech Republic) politicians
Czech officials of the United Nations
Recipients of the Thalia Award